Kohneh Guyeh-ye Bala (also Romanized as Kohneh Gūyeh-ye Bālā; also known as Kohneh Gūyeh) is a village in Shabkhus Lat Rural District, Rankuh District, Amlash County, Gilan Province, Iran. At the 2006 census, its population was 285, in 80 families.

References 

Populated places in Amlash County